Innisfallen or Inishfallen (from  , meaning 'Faithlinn's island') is an island in Lough Leane; one of the three Lakes of Killarney in County Kerry, Ireland. 
Innisfallen is home to the ruins of Innisfallen Abbey.

Geography
Innisfallen is situated about the midway in Lough Leane, County Kerry. It lies within the Killarney National Park.

Access
It is possible for tourists to visit the island during the summer months, with boats leaving from Ross Castle throughout the day.

History 

Innisfallen is home to the ruins of Innisfallen Abbey, one of the most impressive archaeological remains dating from the early Christian period. The monastery was founded in 640 by Saint Finian and was occupied for approximately 950 years. Over a period of about 300 of these, the monks wrote the Annals of Innisfallen, which chronicle the early history of Ireland as it was known to the monks. The monks were dispossessed of the abbey on 18 August 1594, by Elizabeth I.

The location of the monastery on the island is thought to have given rise to the name Lough Leane (Irish Loch Léin), which in English means "Lake of Learning".  According to tradition the Irish High King Brian Boru received his education at Innisfallen under Maelsuthain O'Carroll.
Maelsuthain has been credited as the possible originator of the Annals.

Structures
While the abbey dates back to the seventh century, the oldest extant structure, dated to the tenth century, is the western two-thirds of the abbey church.  The remainder of the church and the main abbey complex were constructed in the thirteenth century.  A third structure, an oratory with a Hiberno-Romanesque doorway, dates from the twelfth century.

Literature
The island is the subject of the melody Innisfallen, the Island — Sweet Innisfallen by Thomas Moore, of which the first verse is: 

It is also the subject of "The Abbot of Innisfallen. A Killarney Legend", a poem by William Allingham, first published in Macmillan's Magazine (August 1864). This was in turn set to music by Geoffrey Molyneux Palmer as The Abbot of Innisfalen, Op. 5, for baritone, chorus and orchestra, which won the cantata prize at the 1908 Feis Ceoil in Dublin.

See also
 List of abbeys and priories in the Republic of Ireland (County Kerry)

Notes

References

Sources

 
 

Archaeological sites in County Kerry
Islands of County Kerry
Lake islands of Ireland
Uninhabited islands of Ireland
Former populated places in Ireland
Religion in County Kerry